Haugesund Idrettslag is a Norwegian athletics club from Haugesund, founded in 1906.

Its most prominent members are long-distance runners Susanne Wigene, Karl Johan Rasmussen and Bente Landøy as well as jumpers Eugen Haugland, Terje Haugland and Hanne Haugland. The latter are all related.

External links
Official site 

Athletics clubs in Norway
Sport in Haugesund
Sports clubs established in 1906
1906 establishments in Norway